Sackville Memorial Hospital is a Canadian hospital located in the town of Sackville, New Brunswick.

It is operated by Horizon Health Network.

It is an acute care community hospital and provides services to the following area of Westmorland County:

 Sackville Parish (Sackville and surrounding areas)
 Dorchester Parish (Dorchester and surrounding areas)
 Botsford Parish (Port Elgin and surrounding areas)

The first baby officially born at the Sackville Hospital when it opened in 1988 was Jessica Laurie Hutchinson, born April 13, 1988.

References

External links
Sackville Memorial Hospital

Hospitals in New Brunswick
Buildings and structures in Westmorland County, New Brunswick
Sackville, New Brunswick